Alexander (Alex) Cappelli (born 4 October 1984) is an Australian musician/actor.

Cappelli has had many acting roles on Australian television, such as a recurring guest role as Mike Pill in Neighbours, Gretchen in the telemovie Little Oberon and a starring role as Kurt Winters in the 2001 children's television series, Short Cuts. As an actor, he is best known for his lead role in the 2005 feature film, Hating Alison Ashley. Working alongside Delta Goodrem and Saskia Burmeister, he played the character of Barry Hollis, the school bully. Other TV credits include, Wicked Science, Blue Heelers and The Brush-Off.  He is also the lead singer, guitarist and pianist in the local Melbourne original rock band "The Collectibles".

References

External links 

 

1984 births
Australian male film actors
Australian male television actors
Australian male child actors
Living people